Cayuga is an unincorporated community in Hinds County, in the U.S. state of Mississippi.

History
The community is named after Cayuga Lake, in New York. Cayuga was once home to two churches. A post office called Cayuga was established in 1829, and remained in operation until 1906. A variant name was "Cayuga Plantation".

Notable person
 Talbert A. Luster, member of the Mississippi House of Representatives from 1912 to 1920.

References

Unincorporated communities in Mississippi
Unincorporated communities in Hinds County, Mississippi
Mississippi placenames of Native American origin